Tanzania competed in the 1999 All-Africa Games held in the city of Johannesburg, South Africa. The team won a single silver medal when Fokasi Wilbrod Fullah came second in the marathon.

Medal summary
Tanzania won a single silver medal. Fokasi Wilbrod Fullah was second to Joshua Peterson of South Africa in the marathon with a time of 2:20:47.

Medal table

List of Medalists

See also
 Tanzania at the African Games

References

1999 in Tanzanian sport
Nations at the 1999 All-Africa Games
1999